8th meridian may refer to:

8th meridian east, a line of longitude east of the Greenwich Meridian
8th meridian west, a line of longitude west of the Greenwich Meridian